Neeraj Shekhar Singh (born 10 November 1968) is an Indian politician belonging from the Bharatiya Janata Party.

Early life 
He was born in Ibrahimpatti in Ballia district, Uttar Pradesh. He belongs to a Rajput family and he is the son of the former Prime Minister Chandra Shekhar and Duja Devi.

Political career 
On 29 December 2007, he contested and won from the Ballia constituency as a Samajwadi Party candidate, in the by-election held due to the death of his father. He got over 295,000 votes.

In 2009, he was re-elected to the 15th Lok Sabha from the same constituency. However, he was defeated in 2014 by Bharat Singh.  Currently, he is a Rajya Sabha member.

His election campaign was supported by Communist Party of India (Marxist), Communist Party of India and former Bharatiya Janata Party MP Rajnath Singh. He left Samajwadi Party on 15 July 2019 and resigned as Rajya Sabha MP on same date and joined Bharatiya Janata Party.

Personal life 
He married Sushma Shekhar and has 2 children.

References

|-

India MPs 2004–2009
India MPs 2009–2014
1968 births
Living people
Children of prime ministers of India
Lok Sabha members from Uttar Pradesh
Samajwadi Janata Party politicians
People from Ballia
Bharatiya Janata Party politicians from Uttar Pradesh